HC Melbourne is an Australian field hockey club based in Melbourne, Victoria. The club was established in 2019, and is one of 7 clubs to compete in Hockey Australia's premier domestic competition, Hockey One.

The club unifies both men and women under one name, unlike Victoria's former representation in the Australian Hockey League as the VIC Vikings (men) and VIC Vipers (women).

HC Melbourne competed for the first time in the inaugural season of Hockey One, which was contested from late September through to mid November 2019.

History
HC Melbourne, along with six other teams, was founded on 17 April 2019 as part of Hockey Australia's development of hockey.

HC Melbourne opted for a pure hockey club name, with a view to attracting the Victoria hockey public community whom CEO Andrew Skillern said "showed the rest of the country and
the world what we can achieve by getting behind the home team and filling the stands as part of the 2019 FIH Pro League and we cannot wait to have the same support in the new league. The club logo includes 'M' for Melbourne.

Hockey Victoria had over 1,400 inaugural HC Melbourne members before the launch of the club. Hockey Victoria had strong aspirations to double their membership base before the season’s opening match, matching the club's bold identity.

Uniform
HC Melbourne's colours are black and white with gold. The uniform moves away from Victoria's traditional navy blue.

Home Stadium 
HC Melbourne are based out of the State Netball and Hockey Centre in Victoria's capital city, Melbourne. The stadium has a capacity of 8,000 spectators, with 1,000 fixed seats.

Throughout the Hockey One league, HC Melbourne plays a number of home games at the stadium.

Teams

Men's team
The following players were named in the men's squad.

Women's team
The following players were named in the women's preliminary squad.

 Laura Barden
 Kristina Bates
 Nikki Bosman 
 Lily Brazel
 Sarah Breen
 Kary Chau 
 Olivia Colasurdo
 Jessie Dean
 Laura Desmet 
 Julieta Galli
 Hannah Gravenall 
 Takara Haines
 Nicola Hammond 
 Carly James
 Caashia Karringten
 Teisha King 
 Bridget Laurance
 Amy Lawton 
 Kelsey Lewis
 Rachael Lynch 
 Claire Messent 
 Anna Moore
 Hayley Padget 
 Carolina Pereyra
 Jordy Polding 
 Madeleine Ratcliffe
 Samantha Snow 
 Sophie Taylor 
 Aisling Utri
 Sabine van den Assem 
 Florine van Grimbergen
 Rosario Villagra

References

Australian field hockey clubs
Women's field hockey teams in Australia
Sporting clubs in Melbourne
Field hockey clubs established in 2019
2019 establishments in Australia
Hockey One
Sport in the City of Melbourne (LGA)